The Marilyn Baillie Picture Book Award is an annual Canadian literary award, presented to the year's best illustrated picture book for children. Sponsored by A. Charles Baillie and administered by the Canadian Children's Book Centre, the award carries a monetary prize of $25,000. The award is named in honour of Marilyn Baillie, a children's book author and early childhood educator who is married to former TD Bank chairman A. Charles Baillie.

The award is one of several presented by the Canadian Children's Book Centre each year; others include the Norma Fleck Award for Canadian Children’s Non-Fiction, the Geoffrey Bilson Award for Historical Fiction for Young People and the TD Canadian Children's Literature Award.

Winners
2006 - Marie-Louise Gay, Caramba
2007 - Sara O'Leary, When You Were Small
2008 - Frieda Wishinsky, Please, Louise!
2009 - Hazel Hutchins and Gail Herbert, Mattland
2010 - Colleen Sydor, Timmerman Was Here
2011 - Laurel Croza, I Know Here
2012 - Geneviève Côté, Without You
2013 - Cary Fagan, Mr. Zinger’s Hat
2014 - Julie Morstad, How To
2015 - Cybele Young, Nancy Knows
2016 - Danielle Daniel, Sometimes I Feel Like a Fox
2017 - Jennifer McGrath, The Snow Knows
2018 - Paul Harbridge and Matt James, When the Moon Comes
2019 - Shauntay Grant and Eva Campbell, Africville
2020 - Sydney Smith, Small in the City
2021 - Jillian Tamaki, Our Little Kitchen
2022 - Julie Morstad, Time is a Flower

References

External links
Marilyn Baillie Picture Book Award

Canadian children's literary awards
Picture book awards
Awards established in 2006
2006 establishments in Canada